Chester-le-Street Hospital is a health facility in Chester-le-Street, County Durham, England. It is managed by County Durham and Darlington NHS Foundation Trust.

History
The facility has its origins in the Chester-le-Street Union Workhouse which was designed by Matthew Thompson and opened in 1856. A new infirmary and isolation block were added to the south of the workhouse in 1898. It joined the National Health Service as Chester-le-Street Hospital in 1948. A new hospital was procured under a Private Finance Initiative contract in 2000: it was built by Robertson Group at a cost of £12 million and completed in 2003.

References

External links
Official site

County Durham and Darlington NHS Foundation Trust
Hospital buildings completed in 2003
Hospitals established in 1856
1856 establishments in England
Hospitals in County Durham
Chester-le-Street
NHS hospitals in England